Neferthenut was an ancient Egyptian queen of the Twelfth Dynasty of Egypt. She was most likely the wife of Senusret III.

Neferthenut was king’s wife, member of the elite (iryt-pat) and she who sees Horus and Seth. She is so far only known from her sarcophagus and from fragments from the chapel found next to her pyramid, which was part of the pyramid complex of Senusret III at Dahshur. The position of her tomb, next to the pyramid of king Senusret III makes it highly likely that she was his wife. Dieter Arnold, who re-excavated the pyramid complex and the tomb of the queen noted the low quality of the inscription on her sarcophagus, which is in stark contrast to the sarcophagi of other royal women buried next to the pyramid. Her tomb was found robbed, only two mace heads were discovered by Jacques de Morgan who excavated the tomb first in 1894.

References

Queens consort of the Twelfth Dynasty of Egypt
19th-century BC women
Senusret III